San Siro Ippodromo is a station on Line 5 of the Milan Metro.

History 
The works for the construction of the station began in November 2010, as part of the second section of the line, from Garibaldi FS to San Siro Stadio. The station was opened to the public on 29 April 2015, a few days before the official opening of Expo 2015.

Station structure 
San Siro Ippodromo is an underground station with two tracks served by one island platform and, like all the other stations on Line 5, is wheelchair accessible.

Interchanges 
Near this station are located:
  Tram stops (line 16)

References

Line 5 (Milan Metro) stations
Railway stations opened in 2015
2015 establishments in Italy
Railway stations in Italy opened in the 21st century